The 1922–23 Ljubljana Subassociation League was the fourth season of the Ljubljana Subassociation League. Ilirija won the league for the fourth consecutive time, defeating I. SSK Maribor 6–1 in the final.

Celje subdivision

Ljubljana subdivision

Maribor subdivision

Semi-final

Final

References

External links
Football Association of Slovenia 

Slov
Slov
Slovenian Republic Football League seasons
football
football